Tibiscum (Tibisco, Tibiscus, Tibiskon) was a Dacian town mentioned by Ptolemy, later a Roman castra and municipium. The ruins of the ancient settlement are located in Jupa, Caraș-Severin County, Romania.

See also 
 Dacian davae
 List of ancient cities in Thrace and Dacia
 List of castra
 Dacia
 Roman Dacia

Notes

References

Ancient

Modern

Further reading

External links 

Dacian towns
Archaeological sites in Romania
Ruins in Romania
Historic monuments in Caraș-Severin County